Amelia Rosa Fournel (born February 22, 1977 in Santa Fe) is an Argentine sport shooter. She produced a career tally of five medals, including four (two silver and two bronze) from the Pan American Games, and was selected to compete for Argentina in two editions of the Olympic Games (1996 and 2000). Having pursued the sport since the age of fifteen, Fournel trained full-time for the Santa Fe Shooting Federation in her native Santa Fe, under her personal coach and brother Claudio Fournel.

Fournel's Olympic debut came at the 1996 Summer Olympics in Atlanta, where she scored 392 points to finish in a thirteenth-place tie with four other shooters in the 10 m air rifle, narrowly missing out the final round by just a single-point gap.

At the 2000 Summer Olympics in Sydney, Fournel qualified for her second Argentine squad in rifle shooting, by having registered a minimum Olympic qualifying standard of 388 and finishing third from the 1999 Pan American Games in Winnipeg, Manitoba, Canada. In the 10 m air rifle, Fournel could not improve her previous Olympic feat in the qualifying stage, as she logged a dismal score of 390 out of 400 that ended her up in a twenty-eighth place tie with three other shooters. In her second event, 50 m rifle 3 positions, Fournel fired 188 in the prone and 177 each in both standing and kneeling to accumulate an overall record of 542 points, leaving her towards the bottom of the leaderboard in the penultimate position out of forty-two prospective shooters.

References

External links
 
 
 

1977 births
Living people
Argentine people of French descent
Argentine female sport shooters
Olympic shooters of Argentina
Shooters at the 1996 Summer Olympics
Shooters at the 2000 Summer Olympics
Shooters at the 2004 Summer Olympics
Shooters at the 2016 Summer Olympics
Shooters at the 1995 Pan American Games
Shooters at the 1999 Pan American Games
Shooters at the 2003 Pan American Games
Shooters at the 2007 Pan American Games
Shooters at the 2011 Pan American Games
Shooters at the 2015 Pan American Games
Pan American Games silver medalists for Argentina
Pan American Games bronze medalists for Argentina
Sportspeople from Santa Fe, Argentina
Pan American Games medalists in shooting
South American Games gold medalists for Argentina
South American Games silver medalists for Argentina
South American Games medalists in shooting
Competitors at the 2006 South American Games
Medalists at the 1995 Pan American Games
Medalists at the 2015 Pan American Games